"Drop the World" is a song by American rapper Lil Wayne, featuring fellow American rapper Eminem. It was the third single released from Lil Wayne's seventh studio album, Rebirth (2010). The song was released on iTunes on December 28, 2009. Lil Wayne, Eminem and Travis Barker of Blink-182 performed the song together along with Drake's song "Forever" at the 52nd Grammy Awards in 2010. On April 10, 2014, the single was certified quadruple platinum by the RIAA.

Rapper Game and Kanary Diamonds made a remix of the song that appears on Game's mixtape The Red Room. Rapper Royce da 5'9" made a remix of the song entitled "Pick Ma Balls Up".

Music video
The video for "Drop the World" was directed by Chris Robinson. It was shot on January 31, 2010, the same day as the 52nd Grammy Awards, where Eminem and Lil Wayne performed together. The video shows people "moshing", rioting, skateboarding and running through the streets of New York. It was premiered on March 5, 2010, on MTV Hits. The main concept of the video centers around Lil Wayne and Eminem being in the midst of a massive riot. Birdman and Lloyd Banks make cameo appearances.

Reception
Despite a generally negative reception for Rebirth, "Drop the World" received more positive reviews. "Drop the World" was arguably the most anticipated song from the album due to its guest feature from Eminem. In a review of the album, NME called the song the only highlight of Rebirth. The article discussed the meaning behind the song, noting that Lil Wayne simply avoids answering a question commonly asked by successful hip hop musicians: "How do you deal with 'real issues' when you've got enough money to buy your old neighborhood a hundred times over?" The magazine notes that, in the song, Lil Wayne avoids commenting on this question, and instead focuses his energy on "being so pissed off you have to get in a spaceship, pick the world up and drop it on some poor girl's 'fucking head.'" Ultimately, the article concludes the song only serves as a "what-could-have-been" demonstration for the album. Writing for Fairfax New Zealand's Stuff.co.nz website, Chris Schulz was less than impressed with "Drop the World", claiming that, even with Eminem, the song was unexceptional.

Track listing
Digital download

Charts

Certifications

References

External links
 Lil Wayne ft. Eminem – Drop the World Music Video

Lil Wayne songs
Eminem songs
Cash Money Records singles
Song recordings produced by Hit-Boy
Songs written by Hit-Boy
Songs written by Lil Wayne
Songs written by Eminem
Music videos directed by Chris Robinson (director)
Rap rock songs
2010 singles
2010 songs
Songs written by Luis Resto (musician)
American electronic songs